John Christian "Chris" Meffert (August 11, 1943 – November 13, 2014) was an American lawyer and politician.

Born in Ocala, Florida, Meffert graduated from Ocala High School. He then received his bachelor's degree from Florida State University and his law degree from the Florida State University College of Law. He served as an assistant attorney general of Florida and then practiced law. In 1977, Meffert served as Mayor of Ocala, Florida and was a Democrat. From 1980 to 1988, he served in the Florida House of Representatives. Meffert worked as a lobbyist and then was appointed executive director of the Florida State Boxing Commission. Meffert died in Salt Springs, Florida in 2014. He had recently been diagnosed with amyotrophic lateral sclerosis (ALS).

Notes

1943 births
2014 deaths
People from Ocala, Florida
Florida State University alumni
Florida State University College of Law alumni
Florida lawyers
Mayors of places in Florida
Democratic Party members of the Florida House of Representatives
20th-century American lawyers